is a village located in Nagano Prefecture, Japan. , the village had an estimated population of 6,379 in 2360 households, and a population density of 30.7 persons per km2.

Geography
Achi is located in mountainous far southwestern Nagano Prefecture, bordered by Gifu Prefecture to the west. Mount Ena (2191 meters) is on the border of the village with Gifu Prefecture

Surrounding municipalities
Nagano Prefecture
 Iida
 Nagiso
 Anan
 Hiraya
Shimojō
Gifu Prefecture
Nakatsugawa

Climate
The town has a climate characterized by hot and humid summers, and cold winters (Köppen climate classification Dfb).

Demographics
Per Japanese census data, the population of Achi has decreased over the past 70 years.

History
The area of present-day Achi was part of ancient Shinano Province. The modern villages of Ochi, Chiri and Goka were established on April 1, 1889, by the establishment of the municipalities system. The three villages merged on September 30, 1956, to form the village of Achi. The neighboring village of Namiai was annexed on January 1, 2006.

On March 31, 2009, the village of Seinaiji, also in Shimoina District, was merged into Achi.

Economy
The economy of Achi is based on agriculture, with Jerusalem artichoke, garlic and Yacón as noted local specialities

Education
Achi has five public elementary schools and one public middle school operated by the village government and one private elementary school. The village has one public high school, which is operated by the Nagano Prefectural Board of Education.

Transportation

Railway
The village has no passenger railway service.

Highway
  Chūō Expressway

Local attractions
Misaka Pass, a National Historic Site

Notable people from Achi
Motoichi Kumagai, photographer
Taro Achi, screenwriter, novelist

References

External links

Official Website 

 
Villages in Nagano Prefecture